The  were a class of seven oilers of the Imperial Japanese Navy (IJN), serving during the 1920s and World War II.

Construction
They were built under pre-Eight-eight fleet plans, the Eight-four fleet plan and the Eight-six fleet plan. All ships of the class were named after capes in Japan (e.g. Irō is a cape at the southern tip of Izu Peninsula).

Service history
The class devoted themselves to importing crude oil from North America and Southeast Asia. The Notoro and the es made 388 voyages carrying a total of 3,000,000 tons of oil up to 1941.

During World War II they were not able to accompany the fleet, due to their low speed. Instead they were engaged in supply duties at naval bases.

Ships in class

Photo

See also
Imperial Japanese Navy bases and facilities
Foreign commerce and shipping of Empire of Japan

Bibliography
Ships of the World special issue Vol.47, Auxiliary Vessels of the Imperial Japanese Navy,  (Japan), March 1997
The Maru Special, Japanese Naval Vessels No.34 Japanese auxiliary vessels,  (Japan), December 1979
Senshi Sōsho Vol.31, Naval armaments and war preparation (1), "Until November 1941", Asagumo Simbun (Japan), November 1969

 

World War II naval ships of Japan
World War II tankers
Oilers
 
Seaplane tenders of the Imperial Japanese Navy
Colliers
Auxiliary replenishment ship classes